Leme do Prado is a municipality in the northeast of the Brazilian state of Minas Gerais.   the population was 4,920 in a total area of

Location

The elevation is 431 meters.  It is part of the IBGE statistical meso-region of Jequitinhonha and the micro-region of Capelinha.  It became a municipality in 1995.

The municipality contains part of the  Acauã Ecological Station, a fully protected conservation unit created in 1974.

Economy

The economy is based on cattle raising, services, and agriculture, with the main crops being coffee, rice, beans, sugarcane, and corn.  There were plantations of eucalyptus trees for charcoal production.  In 2005 there were 404 rural producers but only 5 tractors.  1,200 persons were dependent on agriculture.   there were 6 public health clinics, with 2 of them carrying out diagnosis and complete therapy.  Educational needs were met by 8 primary schools and 1 middle school.  There were 113 automobiles in 2006, giving a ratio of 49 inhabitants per automobile (there were 299 motorcycles).  There were no banks in 2007.

Neighboring municipalities are:  Botumirim, José Gonçalves de Minas, Chapada do Norte, and Turmalina.  The distance to Belo Horizonte is 492 km.

Social Indicators

Leme do Prado is ranked low on the MHDI and was one of the poorest municipalities in the state and in the country in 2000.
MHDI: .683 (2000)
State ranking: 619 out of 853 municipalities
National ranking: 3,257 out of 5,138 municipalities in 2000
Life expectancy: 66
Literacy rate: 78 
Combined primary, secondary and tertiary gross enrolment ratio: .797
Per capita income (monthly): R$118.00 

The above figures can be compared with those of Poços de Caldas, which had an MHDI of .841, the highest in the state of Minas Gerais.  The highest in the country was São Caetano do Sul in the state of São Paulo with an MHDI of .919.  The lowest was Manari in the state of Pernambuco with an MHDI of .467 out of a total of 5504 municipalities in the country .  At last count Brazil had 5,561 municipalities so this might have changed at the time of this writing.

References

See also
List of municipalities in Minas Gerais

Municipalities in Minas Gerais